The Bath Preservation Trust is a charity that is based in Bath, Somerset, England, which exists to safeguard for the public benefit the historic character and amenities of the city, a UNESCO World Heritage Site, and its environs. The trust is independent, funded by public membership, grants, donations and income from four museums that it operates in Bath: No. 1 Royal Crescent, the Museum of Bath Architecture, Beckford's Tower, and the Herschel Museum of Astronomy.

In addition to its campaigning and educational roles, the trust comments on planning applications and takes part in planning policy consultations. It also provides limited financial assistance towards the repair or reinstatement of external architectural features (railings, window glazing bars, urns, gateposts, etc.) on listed buildings in Bath.

History
The trust was founded in 1934 as a small pressure group with the specific aim of fundraising to buy properties in preparation to resist the Bath Bill, which was drafted in order to drive a new east to west road through the centre of Georgian Bath. As a result of victory in this challenge the status of the trust was considerably enhanced, and it was able to propose its own agenda for preserving the city. This included restoring Prior Park's Palladian Bridge and Lansdown's Greville Monument. Following World War II damage to buildings in the city during the Baedeker raids on 25 and 26 April 1942, the trust worked with the War Damage Commission to assist people to restore their buildings. A further campaign against the "Sack of Bath" in 1967–1968 reduced the loss of heritage buildings to modern structures.

Sir John Betjeman was for over 20 years a trustee, and was vice-president from 1965 to 1971 at a time when Bath came under increasing pressure from modern developers and another proposal to build a major road through (in part, under) the city. From 1972, Sir John became the nation's Poet Laureate.

The trust is now an independent registered charity and continues to campaign to save listed buildings, of which Bath has some six and a half thousand, and to ensure a sustainable future for Bath in the context of its status as a World Heritage Site. The trust has over fourteen hundred members and a number of corporate sponsors. Its Patron is Charles III.

In July 2015 the trust became the sole trustee of the Herschel House Trust, which owns the Herschel Museum of Astronomy.

Activities
The trust contributes financially to remedial works that enhance the city's Georgian character. It has rescued properties as diverse as Ralph Allen's quarry workers' cottages in Widcombe which once housed artisans who built some of Bath's great Georgian architectural set pieces, and the historically significant Beckford's Tower, now owned by the Bath Preservation Trust and run as a museum.

A significant part of the trust's work is reviewing and responding to all planning and listed building consent applications submitted to Bath and North East Somerset Council.

It also owns and runs four independent museums; No. 1 Royal Crescent, the Museum of Bath Architecture, Beckford's Tower and the Herschel Museum of Astronomy.

A small former cemetery, the Southcot Burial Ground in Widcombe, is owned by the trust, and is conserved for its wildlife and heritage.

Headquarters
The trust's registered address and offices are at No. 1 Royal Crescent. While most of the rooms in No. 1 operate as a museum, the trust's offices occupy the upper two floors. Since 2018 some staff have relocated to offices at the Old School House, adjacent to the Museum of Bath Architecture.

Trustees
The board of trustees is chaired by Thomas Sheppard who succeeded Edward Bayntun-Coward in February 2016. An earlier chairman was Michael Fenwick Briggs, of Midford Castle.

See also
Buildings and architecture of Bath

References

External links
The Bath Preservation Trust
No. 1 Royal Crescent

Organizations established in 1934
Preservation Trust
Preservation Trust
Preservation Trust
Heritage organisations in England
Building Preservation Trusts
1934 establishments in England
Organisations based in Somerset with royal patronage
Civic societies in the United Kingdom